The 2008–09 season was Hull City's first ever season in the English top flight and, by extension, the Premier League. Home games were played at the KC Stadium, which has a capacity of 25,404. On Friday 6 June 2008 Hull City announced they had sold out all 20,500 season tickets. Hull City's first ever top-flight fixture was a home game against Fulham, which they won 2–1. City finished the season in 17th place in the table, successfully avoiding relegation by the narrow margin of one point over Newcastle United. In the FA Cup, Hull reached the quarterfinals stage for the first time in 38 years, where they were knocked out by Arsenal with a controversial offside goal.

Players

Squad
Updated 24 May 2009.

Transfers

In

Out

Pre-season

Pre-season training
Hull were one of the first Premier League clubs to start pre-season training. Between 4 and 11 July Hull trained in Bormio, Italy.

Preseason friendlies

Premier League

Hull's first season in the top tier of English Football in their 104-year history.

August–December
Hull's Premier League opener was at home to Fulham. Hull started rather poorly and went behind after eight minutes from a Seol Ki-Hyeon header. Hull's comeback came when Geovanni scored from a shot from outside the box, the goal was Hull's first Premier League goal and Geovanni's first as a Hull player. In the second half Hull scored the winner from substitute Caleb Folan's shot when he slotted the ball into the net from Craig Fagan's low cross. Hull won the game putting them joint top of the league, joint second on goal difference and 3rd on alphabetical order. Hull's second game was against Blackburn Rovers away. The home team scored first when Jason Roberts scored in the 39th minute. Hull came back to get a draw; before halftime Australian Richard Garcia scored with a header from a Craig Fagan cross.
There followed a home game against Wigan which turned out to be a heavy 0–5 defeat.
Sam Ricketts turned a corner from Kevin Kilbane in to his own net after 5 minutes to open the scoring.
Antonio Valencia scored after 13 minutes and provided the cross for Amr Zaki to stroke home in the second half. Five minutes later Emile Heskey scored from a poor clearance by Wayne Brown. Nine minutes from time Amr Zaki drove in off the crossbar to inflict the first defeat of the season on Hull.

An away game at managerless Newcastle United followed. Nicky Butt's foul on Péter Halmosi resulted in a penalty which allowed Marlon King to open the scoring for City. He slotted home a second 10 minutes into the second half. Newcastle tried to get back into the match and a Charles N'Zogbia shot rebounded off the post to Xisco who pulled a goal back. As full-time approached, Danny Guthrie was sent off for a foul on Craig Fagan, which broke Fagan's leg and caused him to miss several weeks of football while injured. City secured a deserved 1–2 victory.

A home game against Everton followed in which City took the lead from a Dean Marney corner which was headed home by Michael Turner. Early in the second half another Dean Marney corner was turned in by Phil Neville for an own goal. Everton pulled one back when a Tim Cahill shot bounced in off the crossbar. They drew level minutes later when Leon Osman scored from close range to secure a 2–2 draw.

A trip to Arsenal provided a test for the City but they withstood the pressure during the first half. Following the restart the home team were soon in front when a Cesc Fàbregas shot found the net after coming off Paul McShane.
City responded with a  shot by Geovanni quickly followed by a Daniel Cousin header from an Andy Dawson corner.
Arsenal's William Gallas hit the crossbar and Boaz Myhill saved a late shot from Cesc Fàbregas to give the visitors a 1–2 victory.

A further away game at Tottenham Hotspur followed. City raced into the lead with a   free kick by Geovanni after just nine minutes. Tottenham's Gareth Bale and Jonathan Woodgate hit the post, as did Dean Marney before half time. Neither side managed to score in the second half giving City a 0–1 victory.

After a break for internationals a home game against West Ham United was next up. City's Marlon King created the first opportunity with a cross to Daniel Cousin who volleyed just passed the post. At the other end Carlton Cole shot straight at Boaz Myhill. Dean Marney came close twice for City before Hérita Ilunga headed wide, Valon Behrami shot passed the post and Craig Bellamy shot over the crossbar. Missed chances left the game goalless at half time. Soon after the restart a corner by Andy Dawson was headed home by Michael Turner to break the deadlock. Almost immediately Carlton Cole nearly levelled but his shot came off the crossbar. Kamil Zayatte almost had a second for Hull but shot over the bar leaving Hull with a 1–0 victory over the visitors.

An away match at West Bromwich Albion was the next action by the Tigers. Albion opened the stronger, with Ishmael Miller being blocked by Andy Dawson who picked up an injury which saw him being substituted for Sam Ricketts after only 10 minutes. Albion's Borja Valero had a shot that was saved by Boaz Myhill, Jonas Olsson hitting the rebound off the crossbar for Roman Bednář to miss the second rebound. On a break City gained a corner but Kamil Zayatte headed wide. A Daniel Cousin shot was deflected and Scott Carson scooped the ball off the line to leave the game goalless at half time. Soon after the restart City gained a corner and Kamil Zayatte volleyed home. Albion's Ryan Donk and James Morrison had shots saved before Marlon King put the ball in the area for a diving Geovanni to head in. Minutes later Marlon King was also on the score sheet after slotting in to the corner of the net, leaving it another away victory of 0–3 for City.

A mid-week home game against leaders Chelsea followed, with a record crowd at the KC Stadium. Chelsea were soon in the lead when Frank Lampard lobbed in. Both teams missed opportunities the nearest being Daniel Cousin hitting the post for City. Soon after the break indecision in the City defence allowed Nicolas Anelka to run in and slot home. After missing several attempts Florent Malouda finally scored from six-yards from a Ricardo Carvalho cross. City lost 0–3 in a match which could easily have been a much heavier defeat.

Then on 1 November the Tigers travelled to Old Trafford to play Manchester United away from home. The match was gripping, and after 3 minutes United scored only to be brought back to earth by the Tigers free kick headed in by Daniel Cousin. United went on to score a further 3 goals, but after half time the Tigers looked back on track and regained 2 goals in the final few minutes thanks to Bernard Mendy and Giovanni. The final score 4–3 to Manchester United.

January–May

Results 
 

 Goal originally attributed as an own goal by Pamarot but later awarded to Windass after a review by the Dubious Goals Committee.

Results by round

Final league table

Records
Top Goalscorer
Geovanni – 8

Assists 
Bernard Mendy – 6

Appearances 
Michael Turner – 38
(Turner was one of only two outfield players in the Premier League to play every minute of every game)

Attendance
Average: 24,816
Highest: 24,945 vs. Manchester United
Lowest: 24,282 vs. Wigan Athletic

Squad statistics
Updated 16 May 2009.

Starting 11
Considering starts in all competitions

Awards

Michael Turner was once again named as player of the year, as well as players' player of the year, Hull City Official Supporters Club's player of the year, and CITY Magazine player of the year. Ian Ashbee came second and Geovanni came third, with Geovanni's goal against Arsenal being voted goal of the season.

Non-playing staff

Updated 15 May 2008.
Manager: Phil Brown
Assistant Manager: Brian Horton
First Team Coach: Steve Parkin
Goalkeeping Coach: Mark Prudhoe
Fitness Coordinator: Sean Rush
Under-23 Development Coach: Trevor Morgan
Head of Youth: Billy Russell
Youth Recruitment Officer: Neil Mann
Centre of Excellence Director/FITC Officer: John Davies
Team Surgeon: Christer Rolf
Team Doctor: Russell Young
Head Physiotherapist: Simon Maltby
Assistant Physiotherapist: Liam McGarry
Kit Manager: Barry Lowe
Chief Scout: Bob Shaw

Kits

For the 2008–09 season Hull used the most common black and amber stripes as their home kit. They used a flint coloured shirt as their away shirt. As the flint away kit clashed with Newcastle United's black and white home kit, Hull had to borrow white shorts and socks from their opponents.  The teams met again in the FA Cup so to avoid a similar incident, Hull wore the previous season's all-white away kit in the replay at St James' Park. The goalkeeper kit was light blue, a similar colour had been used as an away shirt in previous seasons. Hull's kit was produced by Umbro and the home shirt had Karoo printed on the front as the sponsor, as did the goalkeeper's shirt; the away and third shirts however had Kingston Communications as the sponsor on the front.

FA Cup

Summary
Hull entered the FA Cup at the third round stage and were handed a home tie against Newcastle United. The match took place on 3 January 2009 at the KC Stadium and although both sides had chances, neither were able to break the dead-lock. A replay at St James' Park took place on 14 January 2009. Newcastle had the better of the first-half. After 21 minutes, Nicky Butt headed a free kick onto the crossbar and later, after a clash of Hull defenders, Michael Owen shot high with only Matt Duke to beat. After half-time, Owen had a low shot low turned round the post by Duke, while Charles N'Zogbia had a shot blocked by Zayatte. Cousin broke the dead-lock on 81 minutes by turning in a Garcia cross. Newcastle had opportunities to equalise but failed to find the target.

Hull's 0–1 win at Newcastle put them in the draw for the fourth round and they were given another home match this time against Football League One team Millwall. The match took place on 24 January 2009 at the KC Stadium. Hull fielded a changed team which saw goalkeeper Tony Warner getting a debut. Turner put Hull in the lead with a header following a Dawson free kick. Millwall failed to make the most of their opportunities and Hull sealed the match with a late strike by Ashbee.

Hull entered the fifth round for the first time since 1989 and were given an away tie with local team Sheffield United. The local derby match took place on 14 February 2009 at Bramall Lane. Sheffield were quickly on the score sheet with a header by Greg Halford from a cross by David Cotterill. Hull responded before half time when Kamil Zayatte headed in an Andy Dawson centre. There were opportunities for both sides in the second half but no one was able to break the 1–1 dead-lock.

The fifth round replay took place on 26 February at the KC stadium. Hull took the lead when a header from United defender Kyle Naughton bounced off his own crossbar and crossed the line for an own-goal. United levelled soon after with a Billy Sharp shot. City sealed the match early in the second half when Péter Halmosi shot in from a Nick Barmby cross. Hull's 2–1 win gave them a place in the last eight for the first time in 38 years.

A quarter-final game against Arsenal at the Emirates Stadium on 17 March 2009 was the prize for getting to this stage in the competition. Hull started the best and after 13 minutes took the lead when a Nick Barmby shot from an Andy Dawson cross was deflected into the Arsenal net. A Geovanni free kick was pushed over by Cesc Fàbregas followed by a Nick Barmby goal being disallowed for offside. Kamil Zayatte also came close with a header before Arsenal started to reply before the break with an Andrey Arshavin shot blocked by Sam Ricketts. Following the break Arsenal continued to apply pressure with Abou Diaby heading wide and then Andrei Arshavin being blocked by Sam Ricketts. A Robin van Persie header was blocked on the line by Andy Dawson and Alex Song shot the rebound wide. Following sustained pressure, Hull were pegged back by Robin van Persie after 74 minutes. Hull almost regained the lead from a Geovanni shot which went wide, but Samir Nasri lofted a free-kick into the area which keeper Boaz Myhill failed to hold and William Gallas headed home the winner from what looked like an offside position. Hull could not respond and lost the match 1–2 on the night with Arsenal going on to play Chelsea in the semi-final.

Results

Records
Top Goalscorer

Assists 

Appearances 

Attendance
Average:
Highest:
Lowest:

League Cup

Summary
On Wednesday 13 August the draw for the League Cup second round was made. Hull were seeded so they couldn't get another Premier League side. Hull City were drawn away to Swansea. The game took place on 27 August. Hull scored first with a Dean Windass goal in the 11th minute. Gorka Pintado equalised for Swansea in the 63rd minute, then he missed a penalty in extra time. The game went to added time. Swansea scored a penalty 14 minutes into added time, taking Hull out of the League Cup in the first round.

Results

Records
Top Goalscorer

Assists 

Appearances 

Attendance
Average:
Highest:
Lowest:

See also
 Hull City A.F.C. seasons

References

External links
 BBC Sport: Hull City fixture list 2008–09 

Hull City A.F.C. seasons
Hull City
2000s in Kingston upon Hull